Philippus Jacobus Brepols (1778 – 1845) was a Belgian publisher and founder of the Brepols printing family-business in Turnhout, Belgium.

Life and work 
In 1795, Pieter Corbeels, a printer from Leuven moved together with his assistant Philippus Jacobus Brepols, to Turnhout, possibly to flee the French military which occupied Belgium at that time. 

Since Corbeels was executed for his fight against the French, his apprentice Philippus Jacobus Brepols, had to take over the responsibility for the printing company. 

The widow of Corbeels managed the business for short while, but from 1800 onwards P.J. Brepols gradually took over the house and the business. On 3 January 1845 P.J. Brepols died and the company was continued by his only daughter Antoinette Brepols, who in 1820 had married Jan Jozef Dierckx, a merchant.

Brepols published popular prints such as catchpenny prints and devotionalia. The prints where originally in black and white but many of them where hand-colored by later owners.

Gallery

Sources
 Roland Baetens (Ed.), Harry de Kok, Pierre Delsaerdt, Gerrit de Vijlder and Ludo Simons, Brepols drukkers en uitgevers 1796-1996, Brepols, 1996.

1778 births
1845 deaths
Flemish publishers
People from Turnhout
19th-century Belgian businesspeople
Belgian printers